Chrysotila is a genus of haptophytes, comprising the two species Chrysotila lamellosa and Chrysotila stipitata.

References

Haptophyte genera